Godley railway station serves the Godley area of Hyde, Tameside, Greater Manchester, England.

It was built to replace the original Godley Junction station. It is placed above a bridge, hence the narrow platforms. Unlike most stations built on the line (with the exception of Flowery Field), it is built on wooden stilts, unlike the stone platforms built for the Woodhead Line.

Services
There is a half-hourly daily service (including Sundays) to Manchester Piccadilly and Hadfield, with an hourly service in the evenings and extra trains during the weekday business peaks.

Additionally the 17:26 service from Hadfield to Piccadilly is the only service not to call at Godley, which only calls at Dinting, Broadbottom, Hattersley, Newton for Hyde, Flowery Field, Guide Bridge, Ashburys and Piccadilly.

Facilities

The station is unstaffed, has one ticket machine at the bottom of the stairs by the entrance to the station and does not have customer help points. Waiting shelters are located on each side, with train running information provided by timetable posters and by LED screens with automated announcements.  No step-free access is available to the platforms.

References

External links

Railway stations in Tameside
DfT Category F2 stations
Railway stations opened by British Rail
Railway stations in Great Britain opened in 1986
Northern franchise railway stations
Hyde, Greater Manchester